The Ambela campaign (also called Umbeyla; Umbeylah; Ambeyla) in 1863 was one of many expeditions in the border area between the Emirate of Afghanistan and the Punjab Province of British India (this area was formally renamed to North-West Frontier Province in 1901, present-day Khyber Pakhtunkhwa); this campaign was against local Pashtuns of Yusufzai tribes of the border region between British India and Afghanistan.

The local Pashtuns were vehemently opposed to British colonial rule and frequently attacked British forces. In 1858, an expedition led by Sir Sydney Cotton drove the Pashtuns from their base. By 1863, however, they had regrouped around the mountain outpost of Malka. A force led by Neville Bowles Chamberlain planned to destroy Malka. They set up an operational base in the Chamla Valley reached by the Ambela Pass, but they were soon bogged down a numerically superior local force. Reinforcements drafted in by the local Commander-in-Chief eventually broke through the pass, received the surrender of the Bunerwals and went on to burn Malka. The expedition saw 1,000 British casualties and an unknown number of Indian casualties.

Expedition
The Lieutenant-Governor of the Punjab authorised an expedition of 6,000 men under Brigadier General Neville Bowles Chamberlain to destroy Malka. The Lieutenant Governor acted without consulting the Commander-in-Chief of the Frontier Force. Chamberlain chose the Chamla Valley as his operational base and the Ambela Pass as the main access. He chose this valley as the access as he believed that the local Bunerwal people were friendly to British forces; this turned out to be a false impression as the Pashtuns had persuaded them that the British would annex their land if they failed to put up a defence.

The first Peshawar column reached the Ambela Pass on 20 October, after struggling on rough terrain, and the rear of the column took another two days to reach the base.

Crag Piquet

On 22 October a reconnaissance was attacked by some Bunerwal tribesman. As a result, Chamberlain proceeded to fortify his position in the pass on two rocky outcrops, but Eagle's Nest and Crag Piquet could only hold small numbers of men. The Pashtuns had amassed a force of local tribesmen consisting of some 15,000 men. The two outcrops were the scene of fierce fighting. On 30 October Crag Piquet was the scene of fierce hand-to-hand fighting that saw two Victoria Crosses awarded; to George Fosbery and Henry Pitcher. Crag Piquet fell to the Pashtuns three times in the next four weeks, but was retaken by British forces on each occasion. On 20 November Chamberlain was seriously wounded. Reinforcements were gradually drafted in on the orders of the Commander-in-Chief Sir Hugh Rose and he replaced Chamberlain with Major General John Garvock on 6 December.

Garvock led a two-column attack consisting of 4,800 men supported by the 11th Bengal Cavalry led by another VC holder Colonel Dighton Probyn VC that broke out of the pass. The Bunerwals surrendered to Garvock on 17 December and he sent a party to burn Malka. The British had restored peace but at the cost of 1,000 casualties.

References

Further reading

 Husain, Mahmud. "The Ambela campaign." Journal of the Pakistan Historical Society 1.2 (1953): 105–117. link

19th-century military history of the United Kingdom
1863 in India
Conflicts in 1863
Military history of Khyber Pakhtunkhwa
Military history of British India